In abstract algebra, a monoid ring is a ring constructed from a ring and a monoid, just as a group ring is constructed from a ring and a group.

Definition
Let R be a ring and let G be a monoid.  The monoid ring or monoid algebra of G over R, denoted R[G] or RG, is the set of formal sums ,
where  for each  and rg = 0 for all but finitely many g, equipped with coefficient-wise addition, and the multiplication in which the elements of R commute with the elements of G.  More formally, R[G] is the set of functions  such that } is finite, equipped with addition of functions, and with multiplication defined by
.
If G is a group, then R[G] is also called the group ring of G over R.

Universal property
Given R and G, there is a ring homomorphism  sending each r to r1 (where 1 is the identity element of G),
and a monoid homomorphism  (where the latter is viewed as a monoid under multiplication) sending each g to 1g (where 1 is the multiplicative identity of R).
We have that α(r) commutes with β(g) for all r in R and g in G.

The universal property of the monoid ring states that given a ring S, a ring homomorphism , and a monoid homomorphism  to the multiplicative monoid of S,
such that α'(r) commutes with β'(g) for all r in R and g in G, there is a unique ring homomorphism  such that composing α and β with γ produces α' and β
'.

Augmentation

The augmentation is the ring homomorphism  defined by 
 

The kernel of η is called the augmentation ideal.  It is a free R-module with basis consisting of 1 – g for all g in G not equal to 1.

Examples 

Given a ring R and the (additive) monoid of natural numbers N (or {xn} viewed multiplicatively), we obtain the ring R[{xn}] =: R[x] of polynomials over R.
The monoid Nn (with the addition) gives the polynomial ring with n variables: R[Nn] =: R[X1, ..., Xn].

Generalization
If G is a semigroup, the same construction yields a semigroup ring R[G].

See also
 Free algebra
 Puiseux series

References

Further reading 
R.Gilmer. Commutative semigroup rings. University of Chicago Press, Chicago–London, 1984

Ring theory